Orthogonius brevilabris is a species of ground beetle in the subfamily Orthogoniinae. It was described by H.Kolbe in 1889.

References

brevilabris
Beetles described in 1889